Finuge is a Gaelic Athletic Association club from Finuge, County Kerry, Ireland.  They currently compete in the Kerry Intermediate Football Championship. They also form part of the Feale Rangers divisional team that play in the Kerry Senior Football Championship. Many of the players also play hurling with Lixnaw in the Kerry Senior Hurling Championship. Being a very small club they have a proud history of supplying players to the Kerry Senior team and the Club has a total of 14 Senior All-Ireland Football medals.

History

Achievements
 All-Ireland Junior Club Football Championship Winners (1) 2006
 Munster Junior Club Football Championship Winners (2) 2003, 2005
 Munster Intermediate Club Football Championship Winners (1) 2013
 Kerry Intermediate Football Championship Winners (1) 2012  Runners-Up 2005, 2010
 Kerry Junior Football Championship Winners (4) 1983, 1996, 2002, 2004  Runners-Up 1998, 2000
 Kerry Novice Football Championship Winners (1) 1996  Runners-Up 1993
 North Kerry Senior Football Championship Winners (5) 1967, 1987, 1996, 2001, 2011  Runner-Up 1945, 1972, 1998, 2004, 2007, 2009

Inter County players
Paul Galvin
Éamonn Fitzmaurice
Jimmy Deenihan
 Enda Galvin
Pat Corridan
 Eamon Breen
Reggie Galvin
 Maurice Corridan
 Mike Conway
 Mike Cronin
 Peter Linehan
 Aidan O' Connell
 Patrick Stackpoole

References

External links
Official Fingue GAA Club website
 http://www.eastkerrygaa.com/
 https://web.archive.org/web/20080406073856/http://archives.tcm.ie/irishexaminer/1998/10/05/shead.htm
 https://web.archive.org/web/20091109031816/http://archives.tcm.ie/irishexaminer/1998/10/02/shead.htm
 https://web.archive.org/web/20090208134602/http://archives.tcm.ie/thekingdom/2007/06/14/story24355.asp

Gaelic games clubs in County Kerry
Gaelic football clubs in County Kerry